August Friedrich Pfeiffer was a Lutheran theologian of Germany.

He was born at Erlangen, January 13, 1748, where he also commenced his academical career in 1769. In 1776 he was professor of Oriental languages, in 1805 head librarian of the university, and he died July 15, 1817. 

He wrote, De Ingenio Oratorio (Erlangen, 1770): — De Jobo Patientiam et Christunu Prcedicante (1771): — De Jobcei Libri Scopo (eod.): — Progr. in Versionem Syriacam ad 1 Timothy Epistolae (1776): — Ueber die Musik der alten Iebriier (1778): — Hebrmaische Grammatik (3d ed. 1802): — leue Uebersetzung des Propheten Hoseas (1785): — Philonis Judei Opera Omnia, etc. (1785-92, 5 volumes; 2d ed. 1820): — Progr. super Psalm 110 (1801): — Progr. super Psalm 72 (1803): — Bibliorum hebraicorum et Chaldceorum Mlanuale ad Prima Linguarum Studia Concinnavit (1809). See Doring, Die gelehrtens Theoloyen Deutschlands, s.v.; Furst, Bibl. Jud. 3:83; Winer, Handbuch der theol. Lit. 1:115, 45, 522. (B.P.)

German librarians
1748 births
1817 deaths